La historia del tango is a 1949 Argentine film.

Cast

External links
 

1949 films
1940s Spanish-language films
Argentine black-and-white films
1940s musical comedy-drama films
Argentine musical comedy-drama films
1949 comedy films
1949 drama films
1940s Argentine films